Norma may refer to:
 Norma (given name), a given name (including a list of people with the name)

Astronomy
Norma (constellation)
555 Norma, a minor asteroid
Cygnus Arm or Norma Arm, a spiral arm in the Milky Way galaxy

Geography
Norma, Lazio, a city in the province of Latina, Italy
Norma, Tibet

Arts, entertainment, and media
Norma (album), by Mon Laferte
Norma (journal), in men's studies
Norma (opera), by Vincenzo Bellini
Norma (play), by Henrik Ibsen
Grupo Editorial Norma, a Colombian publishing house
Norma Editorial, a comics publishing company in Spain, unrelated to Grupo Editorial Norma
Norma, a 1942 sculpture by Abram Belskie
Norma, a novel by Vladimir Sorokin

Tropical storms
 Tropical Storm Norma (1970)
 Hurricane Norma (1974)
 Hurricane Norma (1981)
 Hurricane Norma (1987)
 Tropical Storm Norma (1993)
 Tropical Storm Norma (2005)

Other uses
 Norma (AK-86), a never-commissioned U.S. Navy cargo vessel
 Norma (supermarket), a supermarket in Europe
 NoRMA, No Remote Memory Access, a computer memory architecture for multiprocessor systems
 NORMA (software modeling tool), Neumont Object-Role Modeling Architect
 Norma Auto Concept, a French racing car constructor
 Norma Precision, a Swedish ammunition manufacturer
 Norma (Estonian company), produces car safety system components
 FC Norma Tallinn, an Estonian football club